Sir Arthur Wallace Pickard-Cambridge (20 January 1873 – 7 February 1952) was a British classicist and one of the greatest authorities on the theatre of ancient Greece in the first half of the 20th century.

Pickard-Cambridge was born in Bloxworth Rectory, the son of the Reverend Octavius Pickard-Cambridge (1828–1917), a naturalist and entomologist.

He served as a fellow and tutor at Balliol College, Oxford (1897-1929). 

Following the accidental death (in a fire) of Prof. Alexander William Mair he became Professor of Greek at the University of Edinburgh (1928-1930), then Vice-chancellor of Sheffield University (1930 to 1938).  He was elected a fellow of the British Academy in 1934, and was knighted in 1950 "for services to education", just two years before his death.

Quotations
I rank examinations as they are treated in most schools as among the worst enemies to education, to freedom of thought, and independence of judgment.—Letter to the Daily Mirror 1935

Everything is done for us nowadays: we have lost our independence of thought.  On every side we see men like sheep taking passively what is given to them.. getting even their standard of taste from the radio in this 'Switch it on' and 'Put me through' age. —Address to the Congress of Universities of the British Empire, 1936

Works
 1912. The Public Orations of Demosthenes. Translated by A. W. Pickard-Cambridge. In two volumes. Oxford: Clarendon Press.
 1914.  Demosthenes and the Last Days of Greek Freedom 384-322 BC. New York and London: G.P. Putnams, 1914.
 1927. Dithyramb, Tragedy and Comedy. Oxford: Clarendon Press. 2nd ed., 1962.
 1946. The Theatre of Dionysus in Athens. Oxford: Clarendon Press. 2nd ed., 1956.
 1953. The Dramatic Festivals of Athens. Oxford: Clarendon Press. 2nd ed., 1988, .

Notes

References
The Times, 9 February 1952

External links

 
 
 



1873 births
1952 deaths
English classical scholars
Fellows of Balliol College, Oxford
Fellows of the British Academy
Academics of the University of Sheffield
Academics of the University of Edinburgh
Vice-Chancellors of the University of Sheffield